Nova iznenađenja za nova pokolenja (New surprises for new generations) is the fourth album by the Serbian alternative rock band Disciplina Kičme, released by the Serbian record label PGP RTB in 1990. This is the last album to feature the name Disciplina Kičme, as the following releases were released under the alternative band name Disciplin A Kitschme.

Track listing 
All tracks by Zeleni Zub, except track 7, written by Pop Mašina.

Personnel

The band 
 Sai Baba (Dušan Kojić) — bass, vocals, written by
 Gul Tantor (Srđan Gulić) — drums
 Jy Robokapov (Jurij Novoselić) — saxophone [alt]
 Žele Zerkman (Zoran Erkman) — trumpet

Additional personnel 
 Zeleni Zub (Dušan Kojić) — music by, lyrics by, producer
 Milan Ćirić — recorded by 
 Vlada (Vladimir Žežel) — recorded by 
 Đuka — drums [tapan] on the tracks 2, 4, 6 and 11
 Bilja B. (Biljana Babić) — drums on track 7
 Maša Ž. (Maša Žilnik) — backing vocals on tracks 8 and 10
 Vesna B. (Maša Žilnik) — backing vocals on tracks 8 and 10
 Vinetu — backing vocals on track 8

Legacy
In 2000, the song "Buka u modi" was polled No.88 on Rock Express Top 100 Yugoslav Rock Songs of All Times list.

References 

 EX YU ROCK enciklopedija 1960-2006, Janjatović Petar; 
 Nova iznenađenja za nova pokolenja at Discogs

1991 albums
Serbian-language albums
Disciplina Kičme albums
PGP-RTB albums